Kotaro Higashi is a Japanese footballer who plays as a midfielder.

Career

Professional
Higashi began his career with German club Sportfreunde Eisbachtal.

Following his time in Germany, he played a year with semi-pro Australian team Bonnyrigg White Eagles FC.

Higashi joined United Soccer League club Charleston Battery on 16 March 2017.

References

Living people
Japanese footballers
Japanese expatriate footballers
Charleston Battery players
Association football midfielders
Expatriate soccer players in the United States
USL Championship players
Bonnyrigg White Eagles FC players
1989 births